The bidentate yellow-shouldered bat (Sturnira bidens) is a species of bat in the family Phyllostomidae. It is found in South America.

Taxonomy and etymology
It was described as a new species in 1915 by British zoologist Oldfield Thomas. The holotype had been collected by Walter Goodfellow in April 1914 in Baeza, Ecuador. Thomas described a new, now-defunct genus, Corvira, giving the species the binomial of Corvira bidens. The species name "bidens" is Latin for "two teeth;" of the bidentate yellow bat, Thomas wrote, "lower incisors only two."

Description
It has a long and narrow snout and an overall narrow skull.

Range and habitat
Its range includes Peru, Ecuador, Colombia, and Venezuela.

As of 2018, it was evaluated as a least-concern species by the IUCN, which is its lowest conservation priority.

References

Sturnira
Mammals of Colombia
Mammals described in 1915
Taxonomy articles created by Polbot
Taxa named by Oldfield Thomas
Bats of South America
Mammals of Peru
Mammals of Ecuador
Mammals of Venezuela